The 1941 Van–Erciş earthquake occurred at 23:53 local time on 10 September. It had an estimated surface wave magnitude of 5.9 and a maximum intensity of VIII (Severe) on the Mercalli intensity scale. The earthquake has caused estimated casualties of between 190 and 430 people and also 600 buildings have collapsed.

See also
 List of earthquakes in Turkey
 List of earthquakes in 1941

References

1941 Van-Ercis
1941 earthquakes
1941 in Turkey
History of Van Province
September 1941 events
1941 disasters in Turkey